This is a list of holidays in São Tomé and Príncipe.

Public holidays

References 

São Tomé and Príncipe culture
Sao Tome and Principe
Holidays
São Tomé and Príncipe